Henry Clay Caldwell (September 4, 1832 – February 15, 1915) was a United States district judge of the United States District Court for the Eastern District of Arkansas and the United States District Court for the Western District of Arkansas and later was a United States Circuit Judge of the United States Court of Appeals for the Eighth Circuit and of the United States Circuit Courts for the Eighth Circuit.

Education and career

Born on September 4, 1832, in Marshall County, Virginia (now West Virginia), Caldwell read law in 1851. He entered private practice in Keosauqua, Iowa from 1852 to 1856. He was prosecutor for Van Buren County, Iowa from 1856 to 1858. He was a member of the Iowa House of Representatives from 1859 to 1861. He served in the United States Army from 1861 to 1864, during the American Civil War. As a Colonel he commanded the 3rd Iowa Volunteer Cavalry Regiment that fought against Colonel Joseph C. Porter who was commanding the 1st Northeast Missouri Cavalry.

Federal judicial service

Caldwell was nominated by President Abraham Lincoln on May 2, 1864, to a joint seat on the United States District Court for the Eastern District of Arkansas and the United States District Court for the Western District of Arkansas vacated by Judge Daniel Ringo. He was confirmed by the United States Senate on May 28, 1864, and received his commission on June 20, 1864. On March 3, 1871, Caldwell was reassigned by operation of law to serve only in the Eastern District. His service terminated on March 13, 1890, due to his elevation to the Eighth Circuit.

Caldwell was nominated by President Benjamin Harrison on February 27, 1890, to a seat on the United States Circuit Courts for the Eighth Circuit vacated by Judge David Josiah Brewer. He was confirmed by the Senate on March 4, 1890, and received his commission the same day. Caldwell was assigned by operation of law to additional and concurrent service on the United States Court of Appeals for the Eighth Circuit on June 16, 1891, to a new seat authorized by 26 Stat. 826 (Evarts Act). His service terminated on June 4, 1903, due to his retirement.

Death

Caldwell died on February 15, 1915, in Los Angeles, California.

Works
 "Railroad Receiverships in the Federal Courts of the United States: Remarks of the Hon. Henry C. Caldwell before the Greenleaf Club." St. Louis, 1896.
 "Trial by Judge and Jury." American Federationist, vol. 17 (May 1910), pp. 385–389.

Sources
 
 Appleton's Cyclopedia of American Biography, 1888
 Harper’s Weekly, January 1864
 Joseph A. Mudd, With Porter in Northeast Missouri (1909)
 Richard S. Arnold, George C. Freeman, III JUDGE HENRY CLAY CALDWELL 23 U. Ark. Little Rock L. Rev. 317 Winter, 2001

References

Further reading
 J.B. Follett, "A Just Judge: Being a Brief Sketch of Henry Clay Caldwell of the United States Circuit Court." The Arena, vol. 16, whole no. 80 (July 1896), pp. 177–185.
 Larry Winter Roeder, Judge Henry Clay Caldwell. Amazon: 2011.

External links

1835 births
1915 deaths
19th-century American judges
19th-century American politicians
Judges of the United States circuit courts
Judges of the United States Court of Appeals for the Eighth Circuit
Judges of the United States District Court for the Eastern District of Arkansas
Judges of the United States District Court for the Western District of Arkansas
Members of the Iowa House of Representatives
People from Keosauqua, Iowa
Lawyers from Little Rock, Arkansas
People from Marshall County, West Virginia
People of Iowa in the American Civil War
United States federal judges appointed by Abraham Lincoln
United States federal judges appointed by Benjamin Harrison
United States federal judges admitted to the practice of law by reading law